Dupré Barbancourt (before ? – 1907) was the founder of the company Rhum Barbancourt and was also consul general of Liberia in Haiti.

He died in Paris and is buried in the Père Lachaise Cemetery (division 85).

References

People from Charente
1907 deaths
Burials at Père Lachaise Cemetery
Haitian company founders
French emigrants to Haiti
Year of birth missing